The Cornet John Farnum Jr. House, built circa 1710, is one of the oldest homes in the historic Blackstone Valley town of Uxbridge, Massachusetts. On May 7, 1980, it was added to the National Register of Historic Places.

The house and its historic significance
Uxbridge is in the heart of the Blackstone River Valley National Heritage Corridor, which is the oldest industrialized region in the United States. The Cornet John Farnum Jr. House was the site of the first Uxbridge Town Meeting in 1727. The house today is a museum and headquarters of the Uxbridge Historical Society.  It is an excellent example of early New England colonial architecture.

Builder and original owner
John and Mary (Tyler) Farnum may have moved to the Chockalog section of Uxbridge, then Mendon because of the "witchcraft controversies" that involved Mary's family in Andover. John Farnum Jr. was a "cornet", a now obsolete military position similar to an ensign. He was elected a constable in Mendon in 1703. He had his house built about 1710 in a part of Mendon that is now Uxbridge. Son Moses Farnum's house still stands on Massachusetts Route 146A.

Separation of Uxbridge
On June 27, 1727, a petition was granted to form the town of Uxbridge. The first town meeting was held in the Cornet John Farnum House. One of the first official acts of the town on July 8, 1728, was to appropriate funds for "ÿe good rum for ye raising of ye meeting house.".

Significance in early American history
The significance of the house, the town, and Cornet John Farnum Jr. are now linked to American history as part of the Blackstone River Valley National Heritage Corridor.

See also
National Register of Historic Places listings in Uxbridge, Massachusetts
List of the oldest buildings in Massachusetts
List of the oldest buildings in the United States

Notes

External links

  

Houses in Uxbridge, Massachusetts
National Register of Historic Places in Uxbridge, Massachusetts
Houses on the National Register of Historic Places in Worcester County, Massachusetts